Nikos K. Logothetis (born 5 November 1950 in Istanbul, Turkey) is a Greek biologist and neuroscientist. Logothetis studies visual perception and object recognition; he is well-known for his work demonstrating that BOLD fMRI data is related to neuronal activity. Logothetis directed the department of Physiology of Cognitive Processes at the Max Planck Institute for Biological Cybernetics in Tübingen from 1996 to 2020. He will co-direct the International Center for Primate Brain Research in Shanghai beginning in late 2020 or early 2021.

Education and career 
Logothetis received BS degrees in music and mathematics from the University of Athens, and biology from the Aristotle University of Thessaloniki. He completed his doctoral work at the Ludwig Maximilian University of Munich with Ernst Pöppel and received a PhD in human neurobiology in 1985. Logothetis then worked as a postdoctoral fellow and research scientist at the MIT Department of Brain and Cognitive Sciences before joining the faculty at Baylor College of Medicine in 1990. Logothetis moved to direct the Max Planck Institute for Biological Cybernetics in 1996. Logothetis has held adjunct professorships at multiple institutions, including the Salk Institute for Biological Studies since 1992 and Baylor College of Medicine since 1995.

He is a member of the Editorial Board for Current Biology.

Logothetis is one of the 2003 winners of the Louis-Jeantet Prize for Medicine.

Research 

According to Logothetis, in order to understand a system, a description of it is necessary at all levels. As a result,  intracortical cell recording and also modeling and imaging is conducted at all levels in his department. Therefore, in addition to functional magnetic resonance imaging,  'in vivo' spectroscopy is also used, and the working group is researching smart contrast agents (SCA) in order to make functional imaging useful for effects other  than haemodynamic response.

Logothetis has made significant discoveries, such as finding out that the blood-oxygen-level dependent (BOLD) response is connected to brain activity at a neuronal level. These findings are essential for correct interpretation of measurements with functional magnetic resonance imaging (fMRI).

Animal rights controversy 
In 2014, a German television station aired footage recorded in Logothetis's lab by an undercover representative of the German Animal Welfare Federation documenting violence and harm to animals that might attain the legal definition of a regulation violation for primates. Logothetis announced in response that he would no longer work with non-human primates in 2015 due to lack of institutional support and protection for his research program. Police raids and investigations at this time did not find evidence of animal regulation violations.

Formal charges were brought against Logothetis and two staff members in August 2017 for allegedly delaying euthanasia to sick animals. On 20 February 2018, the Tübingen district court issued all three scientists a "penalty order," consisting of a fine and a sentence that would be automatically transformed into a conviction, which Logothetis immediately appealed. following the order's announcement, the Max Planck Society (MPS) removed Logothetis's animal research responsibilities and right to conduct animal experiments.

Logothetis garnered significant support from members of the scientific community who criticized the MPS's decision to impose sanctions on Logothetis before a verdict had been reached regarding the alleged misconduct. The Society for Neuroscience (SfN) and Federation of European Neuroscience Societies (FENS) issued a joint statement in his support, followed by the International Brain Research Organization.

The specific charges Logothetis appealed were dismissed on 19 December 2018. Subsequently, the MPS restored Logothetis's duties at the Institute for Biological Cybernetics.

Influenced by continued skepticism and lack of support for animal research in Germany, Logothetis announced in 2020 that he would move his department to the International Center for Primate Brain Research in Shanghai and co-direct the center with Chinese neuroscientist Mu-ming Poo by late 2020 or early 2021.

Publications

References

1950 births
Living people
Greek neuroscientists
Cognitive scientists
Foreign associates of the National Academy of Sciences
National and Kapodistrian University of Athens alumni
Aristotle University of Thessaloniki alumni
Ludwig Maximilian University of Munich alumni
Baylor College of Medicine faculty
Max Planck Institute directors
Massachusetts Institute of Technology people
Max Planck Society people
Constantinopolitan Greeks
Academics from Istanbul
Scientists from Istanbul